(united discord of quivering strings), BWV 207.1 (formerly BWV 207), is a secular cantata composed by Johann Sebastian Bach and first performed on 11 December 1726 in Leipzig.

History and text 
Bach wrote several works for celebrations of the Leipzig University, Festmusiken zu Leipziger Universitätsfeiern. He composed this congratulatory cantata to celebrate the appointment of Gottlieb Kortte as professor of Roman Law. The librettist of the work is unknown: it may have been Picander, who had been providing libretti for Bach from at least the previous year when they collaborated on another academic cantata, .

Bach incorporated music from his first Brandenburg Concerto, which was composed years earlier, for the opening chorus. The concerto's third movement is used, with trumpets replacing the concerto's horns, and some of the instrumental music is given to the choir.

Bach led the first performance on 11 December 1726. The cantata became the basis for a similar work Auf, schmetternde Töne der muntern Trompeten, BWV 207.2.

Structure and scoring 
Bach structured the cantata in ten movements, beginning with an instrumental march. The cantata also features a four-part choir for the movements framing a sequence of recitatives and arias. Bach orchestrated it festively with three trumpets, timpani, two transverse flutes, two oboes d'amore, taille, two violins, viola, and basso continuo.

 March
 Chorus: 
 Recitative (tenor): 
 Aria (tenor): 
 Duet recitative (bass and soprano): 
 Duet aria (bass and soprano) and ritornello: 
 Recitative (alto): 
 Aria (alto): 
 Recitative (SATB): 
 Chorus:

Recordings 
 Berliner Solisten, Kammerorchester Berlin, Peter Schreier, Berlin Classics, 1985
 Collegium Vocale Gent, Philippe Herreweghe. J.S. Bach: Tönet, ihr Pauken!. Harmonia Mundi France, 2004.
 Leipziger Universitätschor / Pauliner Barockensemble, David Timm. J. S. Bach: Festmusiken zu Leipziger Universitätsfeiern. Querstand, 2009.
 Bach Collegium Japan, Masaaki Suzuki. J. S. Bach: Secular Cantatas, Vol. 4. BIS, 2017.
 Ex Tempore Choir, Florian Heyerick / Musica Antiqua Köln, Reinhard Goebel BWV 36c, 201, 206, 207, Quodlibet BWV 524. Archiv Produktion  457 348-2, 1996 & 1997.

Related music 
Different attempt have been made to make the closing chorus suitable to more general occasions, by adaptations with a different text. In German, Carus published in 2008 a version "Lob und Preis dem Herrn / Festlicher Schlussgesang zum Gottesdienst (Lauds and praise to the Lord / Festive closing chorus for a service), edited by Karl Kremer and using Bach's scoring. A version "Jauchzet, lobet", with a middle section referring to Christmas or Easter/Pentecost, was adapted for choir and organ.

References

External links 
 
 
 BWV 207 – "BWV 207 - "Vereinigte Zwietracht der wechselnden Saiten" English translation, Emmanuel Music
 BWV 207 Vereinigte Zwietracht der wechselnden Saiten English translation, University of Vermont
 Johann Sebastian Bach (1685-1750) / Cantata BWV 207 "Vereinigte Zwietracht der wechselnden Saiten"  Breitkopf

Secular cantatas by Johann Sebastian Bach
1726 compositions